Maximiliano Andrés Díaz (born 28 May 1990) is an Argentine professional footballer who plays as a goalkeeper for El Porvenir.

Career
Díaz got his senior career underway in 2010 with Deportivo Merlo, he left two years later without featuring but was an unused substitute on two occasions. After leaving in 2012, Díaz had subsequent spells with Ferrocarril Midland, Central Córdoba and Justo José de Urquiza in the following two years. In January 2015, Díaz completed a move to El Porvenir of Primera D Metropolitana. In his second season, 2016, the club won promotion to Primera C Metropolitana. After forty-one matches in the former, he made thirty-six appearances in the latter division. On 26 July 2017, Díaz joined Argentine Primera División side Tigre.

His professional career debut arrived on 8 December 2017 against Temperley; Díaz's only appearance of the 2017–18 campaign. He was released at the end of that season. A move to Fénix of Primera B Metropolitana was announced in July 2018. He featured in games against UAI Urquiza, Estudiantes and Barracas Central before departing at the end of the year to join Ben Hur in January 2019. Three appearances followed in Torneo Regional Federal Amateur.

Career statistics
.

Honours
El Porvenir
Primera D Metropolitana: 2016

References

External links

1990 births
Living people
Sportspeople from Buenos Aires Province
Argentine footballers
Association football goalkeepers
Primera Nacional players
Primera C Metropolitana players
Primera D Metropolitana players
Argentine Primera División players
Primera B Metropolitana players
Deportivo Merlo footballers
Club Ferrocarril Midland players
Central Córdoba de Rosario footballers
Asociación Social y Deportiva Justo José de Urquiza players
El Porvenir footballers
Club Atlético Tigre footballers
Club Atlético Fénix players
Club Sportivo Ben Hur players